Live Sessions EP is the third extended play by Australian singer Dami Im, released on 11 January 2019 by Sony Music Australia. Upon announcement, Im said "I love performing my songs live. It's the only time I can connect with each person on such an intimate level as I share the deepest parts of me." Pre-orders of the EP came with the instant-grat track "Dreamer".

The EP will be supported by the "Dreamer Tour" commencing in August 2019.

Track listing

Charts

Release history

References

Live EPs
EPs by Australian artists
Dami Im albums
Sony Music Australia albums
2019 EPs